Emina Cunmulaj (born September 12, 1984) is an American model of Albanian ancestry.

Biography
Cunmulaj was born in Michigan, United States to Albanian parents from Podgorica, Montenegro. She moved to Montenegro (then a republic of Yugoslavia) at the age of four in 1988. Cunmulaj speaks fluent Albanian, Montenegrin English, Italian, French and Spanish.

She was discovered by Elite Model Management after becoming a semi-finalist in the Elite Model Look Yugoslavia 2001 contest and winning the Elite Model Look 2001 contest. In the same year, she signed a contract with Elite. She resided in Montenegro until the age of seventeen, and then returned to the United States. She is married to businessman Sam Nazarian.

Covers
Emina Cunmulaj appeared in the cover of the following magazines:
Kosovo: Teuta (magazine)|Teuta - January & November 2009,
Canada: Fashion - August 2007
France: France Soir - April 2006; Stiletto (spécial mode) - Spring 2007
Germany: Elle - July 2008, November 2009 & February 2010
Italy: Marie Claire - November 2005
Mexico: Vogue - March 2007
UK: Harper's Bazaar - September 2008
United States: Surface - October 2007

References

External links

Emina Cunmulaj on STYLE.com
Emina Cunmulaj at AskMen.com

1984 births
Living people
Albanian female models
People from Podgorica
21st-century Albanian models
American people of Albanian descent